The MID4 was an experimental sports car produced by Nissan.

History
First unveiled at the 1985 International Motor Show Germany, the MID4 was a concept car designed by Nissan to originally go on sale in the mid-late 1980s. Nissan had aimed the MID4 to compete with European supercars from Porsche and Ferrari. It featured a mid-engine, all-wheel-drive layout as well as a wide array of technology and features that would eventually find their way into other Nissan production cars. The MID4 would evolve into the MID4 II, though it would never be put into production.

Early Development
The responsibility of creating the MID4 was given to a team of designers headed by Shinichiro Sakurai in the spring of 1984. The first four prototypes were completed by March 1985.

MID4

The MID4 was first unveiled at the 1985 Frankfurt Autoshow. The design was inspired by the contemporary mid-engine European sports cars of the time such as the Lotus Esprit and the Ferrari Testarossa. Its all wheel drive system distributed the power from the newly designed VG30DE engine with 33% to the front and 67% to the rear, and was the predecessor to the ATTESA system. A multi-link rear suspension and the double wishbone front suspension were added for better handling. The ATESSA and the HICAS systems would eventually make their way to the Nissan Skyline GT-R in 1987.

MID4-II

The MID4-II made its debut at the 1987 Tokyo Motor Show and featured many revisions to the previous design. The MID4-II was ultimately never produced due to cost. The engine would later make its way in the Nissan 300ZX which debuted in 1989.

See also

 Nissan 300ZX
 Nissan Skyline
 ATTESA
 HICAS
 Nissan VG engine
 Nissan
 Honda NSX

References

External links 
 Nissan | Heritage Collection | Nissan MID 4 (Type II)

MID4